BYU Vocal Point is a nine-member, male a cappella group at Brigham Young University (BYU). Founded by two students, Bob Ahlander & Dave Boyce, in 1991, Vocal Point is under the direction of Emmy award-winning director and former member, McKay Crockett. However in December 2022, Crockett decided to leave as director for a new job opportunity. He is replaced by former member Carson Trautman.

The group has won three Pearl Awards and it was the winner of the 2006 International Championship of Collegiate A Cappella (ICCA). In 2011, the group placed fifth on NBC's third season of The Sing Off.

History
Vocal Point was founded in 1991 by two students at BYU, Dave Boyce and Bob Ahlander. Boyce and Ahlander became introduced to modern a capella while visiting the Eastern United States, where a capella had become popular among colleges. Jill Petersen-Lex became the group's first Artistic Director as the group hoped to introduce the Western United States to contemporary a capella. The three held auditions in the fall of 1991. Although the group intended to have eight members, a double-quartet, they could not choose between two singers so they accepted both and became a group of nine. In 1992, the group recorded its first album, "If Rocks Could Sing" on cassette. In 1994, Vocal Point was absorbed into BYU's School of Music.

The group won the ICCA semifinals for the 2003–04 and 2004-05 competitions, but the group chose to not participate in the finals in New York, because they took place on Sundays. In 2004, Vocal Point performed eighteen shows in Nauvoo, Illinois, for three weeks at the Joseph Smith Academy Theater. James Stevens became the group's director in 2004, directing the group until 2012. In 2006, Vocal Point received three Pearl Awards from the Faith Centered Music Association for "Best Sacred Recorded Song of the Year", "Best Group Recording Artist of the Year", and "Best Performing Artist of the Year" for their newest album "Standing Room Only".

Vocal Point performed at BYU's Homecoming Spectacular in 2006. The same year, they hosted a reunion concert for Vocal Point's 15th anniversary. Competing in the 2006 ICCA competition, the group was awarded first place in the quarterfinals and semifinals before winning first place at the ICCA finals in the Lincoln Center for the Performing Arts in New York 

Directed by the group's former beatboxer, Buck Mangum, in early 2011, Vocal Point again competed in the ICCA. They placed first at quarter finals in Eugene, Oregon. At the semi-finals in Los Angeles, Vocal Point again placed first. At finals in New York, Vocal Point received awards for "best vocal percussionist" to Tanner Nilsson, again "best soloist" to Jake Hunsaker, and second place in the entire competition. The songs they competed with in their set were Michael Jackson's "Beat It," Michael Buble's "Meglio Stassera," a Polish hymn entitled "Infant Holy," and Louis Prima's "Jump Jive an' Wail."

In 2011, Vocal Point competed as part of season 3 of NBC's reality TV series, The Sing Off. The members of the group that competed in the show were Michael "Mike" Christensen, McKay Crockett, Keith Evans, Jake Hunsaker, Ben Murphy, Tanner Nilsson, Robert Seely, Tyler Sterling, and Ross Welch. They were accompanied by Stevens. As a result of their participation in the show, the group was featured in a CNN article discussing how the group represented BYU and the Church of Jesus Christ of Latter-day Saints. From 2012 to 2022, previous member of Vocal Point, McKay Crockett, has served as the group's producer and artistic director. Vocal Point has performed the United States national anthem at Utah Jazz games. On tour in the United States, their concerts frequently sell out. In 2018, Vocal Point won several CASA A Capella Video Awards including Outstanding Collaborative Video and Best Show Tunes/Soundtrack/Theme Song for "Beauty and the Beast A Capella Medley" featuring Lexi Walker and the award for Best Religious Video for "It Is Well With My Soul".

In 2022, they made an all Disney album called Magic: Disney Through Time. They collaborated with many singers to make this album including Adassa, Anthem Lights, Laura Osnes, & former member Yaphet Bustos.

Awards 
 Pearl Award for Best Performing Artist (2005)
 Pearl Award for Best Performing Group (2005)
 ICCA International Champions (2006)
 ICCA Second place (2011)
 Fifth place on NBC's third season of The Sing Off (2011)
Regional Emmy Award in the Arts/Entertainment - Program/Special Category (2017)

Discography 
Discography from 2004 to present was retrieved from BYU Music Store.
If Rocks Could Sing (1992)
Instruments Not Included (1994)
Fatter Than Ever (1996)
Mouthing Off (1999)
Grand Slam (2003)
Standing Room Only (2004)
Nonstop (2008)
Back In Blue (2011)
Lead Thou Me On: Hymns and Inspiration (2012)
Spectrum (2014)
He Is Born (2015)
Music Video Hits (Vol. 1) (2016)
Music Video Hits (Vol. 2) (2018)
Vocal Point (2020)
Newborn King (2020)
Grace (2021)
Magic Disney Through Time (2022)

Awards and nominations 

|-
| rowspan="6" | 2017
| rowspan="6" | A Cappella Video Awards
| Outstanding Collaborative Video
| "Go the Distance (from Hercules)" ft. The All-American Boys Chorus
| 
| rowspan="4" | 
|-
| Outstanding Costume / Makeup
| "Ultimate A Cappella Mashup: 25 Hits, 25 Years"
| 
|-
| Outstanding Video Editing
| "I LIVED"
| 
|-
| Best Musical / Soundtrack Video
| "Go the Distance (from Hercules)"
| 
|-
| rowspan="2" | Best Male Collegiate Video
| "Ultimate A Cappella Mashup: 25 Hits, 25 Years"
| 
| 
|-
| "I LIVED"
| 
| 
|-
| rowspan="10" | 2018
| rowspan="10" | A Cappella Video Awards
| Outstanding Choreography / Staging
| "Beauty and the Beast A Cappella Medley" ft. Lexi Walker
| style="background: #F4F2B0" | 
| rowspan="3" | 
|-
| Outstanding Collaborative Video
| "Beauty and the Beast A Cappella Medley" ft. Lexi Walker and the BYU Ballroom Dance Company
| 
|-
| Outstanding Costume / Makeup
| "Beauty and the Beast A Cappella Medley" ft. Lexi Walker
| style="background: #F4F2B0" | 
|-
| Outstanding Video Editing
| "Beauty and the Beast A Cappella Medley" ft. Lexi Walker
| 
| rowspan="3" | 
|-
| Best Male Collegiate Video
| "EDM A Cappella Mashup"
| 
|-
| Best Electronic / Experimental Video
| "EDM A Cappella Mashup"
| 
|-
| Best Holiday Video
| "Carol of the Bells" by Peter Hollens, ft. BYU Vocal Point, One Voice Children's Choir, BYU Men's Chorus
| style="background: #F4F2B0" | 
| rowspan="3" | 
|-
| Best Religious Video
| "It Is Well with My Soul"
| 
|-
| rowspan="2" | Best Show Tunes / Soundtrack / Theme Song
| "Beauty and the Beast A Cappella Medley" ft. Lexi Walker
| 
|-
| "You Will Be Found"
| 
| 
|-
| rowspan="6" | 2019
| rowspan="3" | Contemporary A Cappella Recording Awards
| Best Show Tunes / Soundtrack / Theme Song
| "Beauty and the Beast Medley" from Music Video Hits, Vol. 2
| 
| rowspan="3" | 
|-
| Best Male Collegiate Album
| Music Video Hits, Vol. 2
| 
|-
| Best Male Collegiate Solo
| Jantzen Dalley and Logan Shelton for "You Will Be Found" from Music Video Hits, Vol. 2
| 
|-
| rowspan="3" | A Cappella Video Awards
| Outstanding Choreography / Staging
| "The Greatest Showman A Cappella Mashup"
| 
| 
|-
| Best Male Collegiate Video
| "You Raise Me Up"
| 
| 
|-
| Best Show Tunes / Soundtrack / Theme Song Video
| "The Greatest Showman A Cappella Mashup"
| 
| 
|-
| rowspan="4" | 2020
| rowspan="4" | A Cappella Video Awards
| Best Male Collegiate Video
| "Circle Of Life"
| 
| rowspan="4" | 
|-
| Best Holiday Video
| "What Child Is This?"
| style="background: #F4F2B0" | 
|-
| Best Religious Video
| "What Child Is This?"
| 
|-
| Best Show Tunes / Soundtrack / Theme Song Video
| "Circle Of Life"
|

See also
 List of collegiate a cappella groups in the United States
 Noteworthy (vocal group), the all female BYU a-capella group

References
33. https://cfac.byu.edu/alumni/byu-music-alum-mckay-crockett-speaks-on-his-experiences-with-music-vocal-point/

External links
Official Site

Brigham Young University
YouTube channels launched in 2010
Collegiate a cappella groups
Musical groups established in 1991
Musical groups from Utah
1991 establishments in Utah
Music-related YouTube channels
Harold B. Lee Library-related University Archives articles